Hadano Castle is the name for the ruinous remains of a castle structure in Hadano City, Kanagawa Prefecture, Japan.  The only features visible are the main mound, scattered bricks and moats.

Castles in Kanagawa Prefecture
Former castles in Japan